Kristene DiMarco (born January 28, 1985, as Kristene Elizabeth Mueller), is an American Christian musician. Her first album, Those Who Dream, was released by Jesus Culture Music in 2008, along with a re-release of the same album in 2010 by Kingsway Music. She released, Safe Place, in 2012 with Kingsway Music. Her next album Mighty was released July 31, 2015 by Jesus Culture Music alongside Sparrow Records.

Early life
DiMarco was born on January 28, 1985, in Niagara Falls, New York, as Kristene Elizabeth Mueller, whose father is Douglas Edward Mueller and mother is Dianne B. Mueller (née, Mielke), and she has three sisters. Her parents are born-again Christians.

Music career
Kristene grew up in Niagara Falls, NY and attended Destiny Christian Church with her family.  In 2002, when Kristene was 16 years old, a new worship leader came on staff at the church.  After being  asked to join the worship team she began learning to play the piano.  A year later, her worship leader asked her to lead a song for the first time.  From that point on, Kristene began writing worship music and leading songs on Sunday mornings with guidance from her worship leader.  Upon graduating High School, Kristene moved to Kansas City and attended the International House of Prayer as an intern.  From there, Kristene moved to San Francisco.

Her music recording career commenced in 2008, with the album, Those Who Dream, and it was released on December 9, 2008 by Jesus Culture Music, with a re-release from Kingsway Music of the same album on July 13, 2010. The album was reviewed by Cross Rhythms.  She released, Safe Place, on April 10, 2012 by Kingsway Music. The album was reviewed by Cross Rhythms, Indie Vision Music, Jesus Freak Hideout twice, Louder Than the Music, and New Release Tuesday.

She has appeared on Bethel Music's album, You Make Me Brave, performing the single, "It Is Well", and this charted on the Billboard magazine song chart, Hot Christian Songs, reaching a peak of No. 27. In the spring of 2016, Bethel Music announced that Kristene would be joining their Collective.

Personal life
Kristene is married to Jordan DiMarco, and they have two children, daughter Lorelai Praise and son Nicodemus León. They reside in Redding, California.

Discography

Studio albums

Live albums

Singles

Other charted songs

Awards and nominations

GMA Dove Awards

!
|-
| 2022
| "I Need You"
| Rock/Contemporary Recorded Song of the Year
| 
| 
|-
|}

Notes

References

External links
 Official website

1985 births
Living people
American performers of Christian music
Musicians from California
Musicians from New York (state)
Songwriters from California
Songwriters from New York (state)
Musicians from Niagara Falls, New York
People from Redding, California
American people of German descent
21st-century American women musicians
21st-century American musicians